Taylor Township is the name of some places in the U.S. state of Minnesota:
Taylor Township, Beltrami County, Minnesota
Taylor Township, Traverse County, Minnesota

See also: Taylor Township (disambiguation)

Minnesota township disambiguation pages